The Seymour Community School District is a rural public school district headquartered in Seymour, Iowa.

The district spans western Appanoose County and eastern Wayne County. The district serves the city of Seymour, the town of Promise City and surrounding rural areas.

The school's mascot is the Warriors. Their colors are red and black.

Schools
The district operates two schools in a single facility at 100 South Park in Seymour:
Seymour Elementary School
Seymour High School

Seymour High School

Athletics 
The Warriors compete in the Bluegrass Conference, including the following sports:

Volleyball 
Football (8-man)
Basketball (boys and girls)
Track and Field (boys and girls)
Baseball 
Softball

See also
List of school districts in Iowa
List of high schools in Iowa
brean

References

External links
 Seymour Community School District

School districts in Iowa
Education in Appanoose County, Iowa
Education in Wayne County, Iowa